The nullum ctenotus (Ctenotus aphrodite)  is a species of skink found in Western Australia.

References

nullum
Reptiles described in 1990
Taxa named by Glen Joseph Ingram
Taxa named by Greg V. Czechura